"Grateful" is a single by Polish singer Edyta Górniak. The song was released on 24 February 2016. It was written by Karlina Covington, Monika Borzym-Janowska and produced by Monika Borzym-Janowska, Mariusz Bogdan Obijalski, Robert Kamil Lewandowski.

The song took third place in the Polish national final for the Eurovision Song Contest 2016, which took place on 5 March 2016.

The single peaked at number 43 on the Polish Airplay Chart.

Music video 
An audio to accompany the release of "Grateful" was released onto YouTube on February 24, 2016.

Track listing
Digital download
"Grateful" – 3:07

Charts

Weekly charts

Release history

References

2016 singles
2016 songs
Pop ballads
Universal Music Group singles